Arkansas v. Sanders, 442 U.S. 753 (1979), was a decision by the United States Supreme Court, which held that absent exigency, the warrantless search of personal luggage merely because it was located in an automobile lawfully stopped by the police, is a violation of the Fourth Amendment and not justified under the automobile exception. Similar to United States v. Chadwick (1977), the luggage was the subject of police suspicion before being placed in the vehicle.

Sanders resolved two distinct lines of cases: on the one hand, Carroll v. United States (1925) laid down the automobile exception which allowed for warrantless searches of automobiles; on the other hand, Chadwick did not allow for a warrantless search of luggage. Sanders declined to extend the automobile exception here, again stressing, as in Chadwick, the heightened expectation of privacy in one's luggage.

See also
List of United States Supreme Court cases, volume 442
United States v. Ross, 
California v. Greenwood,

External links
 

Overruled United States Supreme Court decisions
United States Supreme Court cases
United States Supreme Court cases of the Burger Court
United States Fourth Amendment case law
1979 in United States case law
1979 in Arkansas
Legal history of Arkansas